K. Jayaram is a nature photographer and a pioneer in macro photography in India. He has been in this field for over 40 years. His photos have been published in internationally renowned magazines.

He is also interested in botany and taxonomy. He has co-authored a book on butterflies.

A frog species (Philautus jayarami) and a jumping spider (Myrmarachne jayaramani) have been named after him.

References

Year of birth missing (living people)
Indian nature photographers
Living people